Brachytrupanea is a genus of tephritid  or fruit flies in the family Tephritidae.

Species
Brachytrupanea brachystigma (Bezzi, 1924)
Brachytrupanea semiatrata (Hering, 1942)

References

Tephritinae
Tephritidae genera
Diptera of Africa